Helmut Kuckelkorn (9 February 1937 – 18 March 2018) was a German racing cyclist. He rode in the 1961 Tour de France.

References

External links
 

1937 births
2018 deaths
German male cyclists
Place of birth missing
People from Würselen
Sportspeople from Cologne (region)
Cyclists from North Rhine-Westphalia